The 1882 Northwestern Purple football team was an American football team that represented Northwestern University during the 1882 college football season. The Northwestern team played its first intercollegiate football game against Lake Forest College on November 11, 1882.  Northwestern lost after giving up one goal from touchdown, two touchdowns, and two "safety touchdowns."  In a rematch played one week later between the same teams, Northwestern recorded its first intercollegiate football victory with two touchdowns and one goal from touchdown.

Schedule

References

Northwestern
Northwestern Wildcats football seasons
Northwestern Purple football